Hawaii is a 2013 Spanish language gay romantic drama film by Argentine director Marco Berger. Set in rural Argentina, it tells the story of two young men from different social backgrounds coming to terms with their growing attraction for each other.

Plot
Martín (Mateo Chiarino), an orphan, arrives at his former hometown hoping to stay with his aunt after his grandmother had died. He finds out that his aunt had moved without leaving a forwarding address. With no place to stay and little money, he beds down behind the ruins of an abandoned building. He looks around for odd jobs and is eventually hired by the writer Eugenio (Manuel Vignau), a former childhood playmate. Martín does not want to admit that he is homeless, and lies to Eugenio that he is staying with his aunt. Eugenio eventually finds out about Martín's situation and convinces Martín to stay at his house for the summer.

At first Eugenio does not seemingly remember much about Martín, but little by little they start to recall their shared memories as children. Eugenio realizes his growing attraction to Martín but is reluctant to pursue it, as he does not want to seem to be taking advantage of Martín's current financial situation. He is also afraid that even if the soft-spoken Martín might reciprocate his feelings, it might only be because Martín feels indebted to him. Martín himself is attracted to Eugenio, but he does not know if Eugenio is gay. And given his impoverished background, he does not want to presume on Eugenio's kindness.

Nonetheless, Eugenio and Martín slowly grow closer together, and Eugenio finds it becoming increasingly difficult to hide his attraction. One day while moving some furniture, Eugenio accidentally knocks over some drawings of naked men from his desk. Martín sees the drawings, but Eugenio pointedly avoids talking about it. It dawns on Martín that Eugenio might be attracted to him. Martín confirms his suspicions when he sees Eugenio's flustered reaction after he deliberately strips in front of Eugenio one night with the excuse of doing laundry.

Martín kisses Eugenio the next morning, confident that Eugenio is also attracted to him. But Eugenio unexpectedly rebuffs him, and Martín leaves confused. That afternoon, Eugenio discovers that Martín had packed up and left. He searches for him for several days but is unable to find him. Eugenio remembers Martín reminiscing about "dos ananás" ("two pineapples"). He realizes that Martín was talking about a picture from a Hawaii reel that they used to look at on a View-Master as children. He looks for the reel and the old View-Master and leaves them behind the abandoned building that Martín used to stay at. A few days later, Martín comes back, carrying the View-Master with him. They smile at each other and kiss.

Cast
Manuel Vignau as Eugenio
Mateo Chiarino as Martín
Luz Palazón as the señora 
Antonia De Michelis as the neighbor
Manuel Martínez Sobrado as Eugenio's brother

Production
Hawaii was produced by a partnership between director and screenwriter Marco Berger and the musician/composer Pedro Irusta. It was funded through Kickstarter campaigns. The first campaign with a target budget of $40,000, ended unsuccessfully. The campaign was relaunched with a smaller target budget of $20,000. It successfully raised $27,000 allowing the shooting to continue. Berger describes Hawaii as a "Jane Austen contemporary story", noting that it evokes the same classic tale of two people from different social backgrounds and the dynamics between the powerful and the helpless.

Screenings
The film was an official selection at the Buenos Aires International Festival of Independent Cinema (BAFICI), the BFI Flare: London LGBT Film Festival of the BFI London Film Festival, the Thessaloniki International Film Festival, and films festivals in Barcelona, Seoul, Taipei, Copenhagen, and Berlin.

See also
Ausente (film)
Plan B (2009 film)

References

External links

2013 films
2010s Spanish-language films
Argentine LGBT-related films
Films directed by Marco Berger
Argentine romantic drama films
2013 romantic drama films
2010s Argentine films